Allotinus fabius, the angled darkie, is a small butterfly found in India, Myanmar and South East Asia that belongs to the lycaenids or blues family.

Range
Naga Hills, Myanmar, Borneo and Philippines. Nagas to Karens. Malaya

Status
Very rare.

See also
List of butterflies of India
List of butterflies of India (Lycaenidae)

Cited references

References
Print

Online

External links

Allotinus
Butterflies of Asia
Butterflies of Borneo
Butterflies described in 1887